Cross-Cultural Research (formerly Behavior Science Research) is a peer-reviewed academic journal that publishes papers in the field of Social Sciences. The journal's editor is Carol R. Ember (Human Relations Area Files). The journal has been in publication since 1966 and is currently published by SAGE Publications  on behalf of the Society for Cross-Cultural Research.

Scope 
Cross-Cultural Research publishes articles that describe cross-cultural and comparative studies in all human sciences. The journal covers topics such as societies, nations and cultures. Cross-Cultural Research focuses on the systematic testing of theories about human societies and behaviour.

Abstracting and indexing 
Cross-Cultural Research is abstracted and indexed in, among other databases:  SCOPUS, and the Social Sciences Citation Index. According to the Journal Citation Reports, its 2017 impact factor is  0.975, ranking it 56 out of 98 journals in the category "Social Sciences, Interdisciplinary".

References

External links 
 

English-language journals
SAGE Publishing academic journals